Arthur Windham Baldwin, 3rd Earl Baldwin of Bewdley (22 March 1904 – 5 July 1976) was a British businessman, RAF officer, and author. His books included a combative defence of the posthumous reputation of his father, Stanley Baldwin, the former prime minister of the UK, in which he severely criticised several leading historians of the time.

Early life
Baldwin was the younger son of Stanley Baldwin, later 1st Earl of Baldwin of Bewdley, and his wife, Lucy, . He was known to his family and friends by the nickname "Bloggs".

He was educated at Eton College and Trinity College, Cambridge.

Career
In the inter-war years Baldwin was a director of several companies, including the Round Oak Steel Works, Redpath, Brown, and the Great Western Railway, and between 1938 and 1974 he was a director of the Equitable Life Assurance Society. He served in the Royal Air Force during World War II. Despising patronage, he successfully set out to gain a commission through the ranks.

Baldwin published three books in the 1950s and 60s. The first was a biography of his father, written as a result of his strong feeling that the official biography by G. M. Young did not do Stanley Baldwin justice. Baldwin strongly criticised not only Young, but other historians, including John Wheeler-Bennett, D. C. Somervell and Sir Lewis Namier for, in his view, misjudging the former prime minister.  His second book, The Macdonald Sisters was a study of the four daughters of the Rev G. B. Macdonald: Alice married Rudyard Kipling's father; Georgiana married Edward Burne-Jones; Agnes married Edward Poynter; and Louisa married Alfred Baldwin, Windham's paternal grandfather. In 1967 he published a memoir of his wartime experiences. The reviewer in The Times, commented, "He tells it all with amusement and skill … the atmosphere of the RAF seeps unmistakably through."

Peerage
On 10 August 1958, on the death of the second earl, his elder brother, Oliver, Baldwin succeeded to the United Kingdom titles of Earl Baldwin of Bewdley and Viscount Corvedale. He spoke in the House of Lords from time to time, mostly on the subjects of transport and industry.

Personal life
On 25 August 1936, Baldwin was married to Joan Elspeth Tomes, daughter of Charles Alexander Tomes, merchant in the Far East with Shewan, Tomes & Co. They had one child:

 Edward Alfred Alexander Baldwin, 4th Earl Baldwin of Bewdley, (3 January 1938 – 16 June 2021)

The 3rd Earl Baldwin of Bewdley died on 5 July 1976, aged 72. The Countess Baldwin of Bewdley died in 1980.

Arms

Works

Notes, references and sources
Notes

References

Sources
 
 

1904 births
1976 deaths
People educated at Eton College
Alumni of Trinity College, Cambridge
Children of prime ministers of the United Kingdom
Earls Baldwin of Bewdley
Royal Air Force officers
English biographers
English autobiographers